Caye Sable is a small island of Haiti located in the Anse-à-Galets commune, about 50 km west of Port-au-Prince.

The island is a cay accessible by small boats from the village of Petite Anse in the extreme south of Gonâve Island. There is no source of fresh water on the island.

See also
List of islands of Haiti
Ilet a Brouee
Santa Cruz del Islote

References 

Ilet a Brouee